What's the World Coming To? is a 1926 American silent comedy film directed by Richard Wallace and starring Clyde Cook. The film's working title was Furious Future. A restoration of the film was completed in September 2015 as a collaboration between Carleton University, New York University, and the San Francisco Silent Film Festival.

Plot
Set 100 years in the future, women dominate society and men are the "weaker" sex, assuming the stereotypical roles of pampered women. A stay-at-home husband of a well-off successful businesswoman, Billie, is cheating on her. Another dominant woman tries to seduce Cook, but a ruckus breaks out when Billie returns home and finds the two flirting.

Cast
 Clyde Cook as Claudia Catwalloper, the Blushing Groom / The Baby
 Katherine Grant as Billie, the Bride
 James Finlayson as The Groom’s Father
 Laura De Cardi as Lieutenant Penelope, the Villain 
 Martha Sleeper as The Butler
 Helen Gilmore as A neighbor (uncredited)
 Stan Laurel as Man in window (uncredited)

See also
 List of American films of 1926
 Stan Laurel filmography

References

External links

What's the World Coming To? at silentera.com
 (restored edition)

1926 films
1926 short films
1926 comedy films
Silent American comedy films
American silent short films
American black-and-white films
Films directed by Richard Wallace
American comedy short films
1920s American films